Sankey Winter (1688–1736) was an Anglican priest in Ireland.

Ledwich was born in County Kildare and educated at Trinity College, Dublin. Winter was Archdeacon of Achonry from 1712 to 1719 and Archdeacon of Killala from 1719 to 1724. He was installed as Prebendary of Donadea and Archdeacon of Kildare on 11 May 1724; and Dean of Kildare on 8 October 1725, holding all three positions until his death.

References

1736 deaths
Alumni of Trinity College Dublin
18th-century Irish Anglican priests
1688 births
Deans of Kildare
Archdeacons of Kildare
Archdeacons of Killala
Archdeacons of Achonry
People from County Kildare